Mike French (born 19 November 1975 in the United States) was a United States rugby union player. His playing position was prop. He was selected as a reserve for the United States at the 2007 Rugby World Cup, but did not make an appearance. He though made 8 appearances for the United States national team in other matches.

Reference list

External links
itsrugby.co.uk profile

1975 births
United States international rugby union players
Living people
Rugby union props
Sportspeople from Anchorage, Alaska